Darr Khuda Say is a 2019 Pakistani television series produced by Abdullah Kadwani and Asad Qureshi under 7th Sky Entertainment. It stars Sana Javed and Imran Abbas in the lead roles. It is based on #MeToo and sexual harassment in the workplace. It is digitally available to stream on YouTube and in some countries on VIU App.

Synopsis 
Shahwais (Imran Abbas) is a handsome, rich, and arrogant businessman. He is married to an older and terminally ill person. Shahwais is a womanizer and dislikes his wife. He constantly tries to get rid of her since he only married her to take over her business.

His next womanizing target is Afreen (Sana Javed), an employee in his office. Afreen is a beautiful, innocent, and noble girl. She is the apple of her parents' eyes and is the most respectful child out of four. Shahwais tries to pursue her and constantly harasses her. However, after getting rejected by her many times, he asks another employee, Kashif, to photoshop fake pictures of Afreen and make them look as if she is having an affair with someone. Shahwais tries to blackmail her and threatens to expose the pictures to her parents if she refuses his advances. Afreen realizes this and stands up for herself by telling Shahwais that she is not like any of the other girls and slaps him. She tells him to fear Allah's punishment, but Shahwais takes the remark as a joke. What follows in the series is the aftermath as Shahwais tries to take revenge on her by using the fake pictures and showing them to her parents. Afreen's parents are ashamed and disappointed in her as they believed her to be their most honourable child. They start to believe what Shahwais says and turn against Afreen. She is heartbroken by the fact that her parents were unable to see her innocence and trusted a twisted man over her. Meanwhile, Afreen's older sister, Tamkeen, who is a divorcee, becomes attracted to Shahwais. She breaks off her previous engagement with a teacher with two children and marries Shahwais. However, Shahwais is still attracted to Afreen and uses her older sister as a mean to get close to her. Despite the hardships in her life, Afreen does not lose faith in Allah and believes that one day her innocence will be proven and Shahwais will be brought to justice.

This drama depicts the harsh reality of workplace harassment and one girl's struggle and perseverance. It is also a reminder to people that Allah is always with those who put their trust in him, for he is the only one who opens the door for punishment, forgiveness, and justice.

Cast
Sana Javed as Afreen Siddiqui
Imran Abbas as Shahvez Akhtar
Qavi Khan as Mazhar Siddiqui
Mizna Waqas as Maham (Afreen's sister-in-law, Tahir's wife)
Kiran Haq as Tamkeen Siddiqui, afreens sister.
Saleem Mairaj as Rasheed
Ali Ansari as Azhar Siddiqui, Afreens brother.
Birjees Farooqui as Tahira (Raza's mother)
Hammad Farooqui as Raza Haroon (Afreen's "ex" love interest)
Namra Shahid as Shehla (Afreen's sister-in-law, Azhar's wife)
Mariam Mirza as Gul (Shawais' older wife)
Ali Rizvi as Kashif
Gul-e-Rana as Afreen's Phuppo
Sajida Syed as Afreen's mother
Farah Nadir as Seema's mother
Fahima Awan as Aasia (Afreen's friend)
Faria Sheikh as Seema (Shehla's younger sister)
Rizwan Ali Jaffri as Mohsin (Afreen's ex-fiance)
Shahzad Sheikh as Moien (Guest Appearance)

Soundtrack 
The original soundtrack of Darr Khuda Say is composed and sung by Sir Sahir Ali Bagga Jee. The song is available on Patari, and Apple Music.

Awards and nominations

References

2019 Pakistani television series debuts